Zachary Clegg Morris (born 4 September 1978 in Barnsley) is a former English cricketer who captained England Under-19 team on one occasion. He also played two first-class matches for Hampshire scoring 11 runs at an average of 2.75 and despite bowling 34 overs failed to take a wicket, although he was part of the side that were promoted as runners-up from the second division in 2001. Whilst playing with Hampshire he got the opportunity to be part of a family duo often playing alongside his older brother Alexander. 

In 4 List A games for the county he scored 7 runs at an average of 2.33 and took 3 wickets at an average of 43. His best performance was 3/31.

In 2016, he was reported to be "living and working in his native Barnsley".

References

External links
Cricinfo Profile

1978 births
Living people
English cricketers
Hampshire cricketers
Hampshire Cricket Board cricketers